Sly Fox was a short-lived American pop duo, consisting of Gary "Mudbone" Cooper and Michael Camacho. The duo came to prominence in the mid-1980s with their UK/U.S. top 10 hit single "Let's Go All the Way". They released one studio album of the same name which charted within the U.S. Top 40, and a couple of subsequent singles before breaking up.

History
The duo was assembled by record producer Ted Currier, and presented as wholesome, clean-living teen idols. Cooper, a funk session musician, had previously been a vocalist with Parliament-Funkadelic and Bootsy's Rubber Band. Camacho was a protégé of David Bowie. The group's touring band included Cooper's former Rubber Band bandmates Frank "Kash" Waddy (drums), Joel "Razor Sharp" Johnson (keyboards), and Flip Cornett (guitar/bass), along with "Bad Boy Troy" Tipton (guitar), Greg Seay, and current Zapp keyboardist, Greg Jackson.

Their sole album, Let's Go All the Way, was released on Capitol Records in December 1985. The eponymous track became a top 10 hit in both the U.S. and UK in 1986. The follow-up singles "Como Tu Te Llama", "Stay True" and "Don't Play with Fire" did not perform as well and sold poorly. The group disbanded in 1988. 

In 1989, Sly Fox reformed briefly in Cincinnati, Ohio. With a demo budget from Bill Laswell, the duo recorded four songs, including Cooper’s “There’s No Place Like Home”. The recording sessions included musicians James Ibold (guitar), Chris Sherman (bass), Casey McKeown (keyboard) and Johnny Miracle (drums). Previously unsettled artistic differences arose between the duo, and they abruptly separated again. Cooper returned to tour with George Clinton, while Camacho headed to Los Angeles to focus on a film career.

Since the dissolution of the group, Cooper has remained involved in the music industry. His most recent album, 2006's Fresh Mud, was a collaboration with Dave Stewart that combined blues and rap. Camacho has concentrated on acting, directing, and singing. He released the solo album Just for You in 2007. He is also a proprietor of a well-known jazz lounge and bar in New York City and has started a funk band named The Funky Foxes.

Discography

Studio albums

Singles

References

External links
 Sly Fox at Discogs.

American pop music duos
American new wave musical groups
Male musical duos
Musical groups established in 1985
Musical groups disestablished in 1988
Musical groups from Miami
1985 establishments in the United States
Capitol Records artists